The Ibero-American Festival of Short films ABC (FIBABC) has its origins in the 2009 when the journalists and film makers, helmed by Pedro Touceda Fernandez and supported by the Spanish ABC with the Community of Madrid and Spanish Academy of Arts and Cinematographic Sciences (AACCE) set up an international cinematographic festival of short films.
The FIBABC takes place every year between 5 September – 25 November.

Editions
• 2010 • 2011 • 2012 • 2013 • 2014 • 2015 • 2016 • 2017 • 2018 •

Impact
The festival has become an important showcase for International Short films from all over the world.

Programmes
The FIBABC Film Festival is organised in various sections:
Festival de cortometrajes – The main yearly event of the Short films festival.
In Competition – About 350 films competing for the Awards. They are projected in the fibabc.abc.es.

Juries 
The Festival's board of filmmakers appoints the juries responsible for choosing which films will receive a FIBABC award.

Awards
Competition
 Premio del Jurado al Mejor Cortometraje de FIBABC – Jury Prize to Best Short Film
 Premio al Mejor Cortometraje Español de Ficción - Best Spanish Fiction Film
 Premio al Mejor Cortometraje de América Latina - Best Latino American Film
 Premio a la Mejor Actor – Best Actor
 Premio a la Mejor Actriz – Best Actress
 Premio de la Crítica de ABC al Mejor Corto no estrenado en España – Critics Prize to Best Short Film
 Premio del Público al Mejor Cortometraje – Viewers Prize
 Premio al Mejor Corto de Escuela de Cine/Centro Universitario – Best Student film
 1ª Mención Especial del Jurado – First Special Mention of Jury
 2ª Mención Especial del Jurado – Second Special Mention of Jury
 3ª Mención Especial del Jurado – Third Special Mention of Jury
I-Shorts Contest
 Premio del Jurado al Mejor i-Corto - Jury Prize to Best I-Short
 1ª Mención Especial del Jurado - First Special Mention of Jury
 2ª Mención Especial del Jurado - Second Special Mention of Jury
 Premio del Público al Mejor i-Corto - Viewers Prize to Best I-Short

References

External links
FIBABC nominees in the Spanish ABC
Best Performance 2013
FIBABC winners 2013 in the Spanish ABC
Awards of the IV FIBABC Edition in the Spanish ABC
IMDb Festivals
FaceBook

Further reading

Film festivals in Madrid
Short film festivals
Student film festivals
Film festivals established in 2009
November events
2009 establishments in Spain